Juliette Labous (born 4 November 1998) is a French racing cyclist, who currently rides for UCI Women's WorldTeam . She rode in the women's road race event at the 2017 UCI Road World Championships.

Major results

2015
 National Junior Road Championships
1st  Time trial
5th Road race
 2nd Trofeo Alfredo Binda-Comune di Cittiglio Juniors
 UEC European Junior Road Championships
4th Road race
5th Time trial
 5th Time trial, UCI World Junior Road Championships
2016
 National Junior Road Championships
1st  Time trial
1st  Road race
 1st  Overall Albstadt-Frauen-Etappenrennen
1st Stage 2b
 3rd  Time trial, UCI World Junior Road Championships
 3rd Time trial, UEC European Junior Road Championships
2017
 1st Stage 5 Tour de Feminin-O cenu Českého Švýcarska
 4th Time trial, National Road Championships
 UEC European Under–23 Road Championships
6th Road race
10th Time trial
 9th Overall Tour of Norway
 9th La Classique Morbihan
2018
 1st Stage 1 (TTT) Giro Rosa
 National Road Championships
2nd Time trial
6th Road race
 3rd Open de Suède Vårgårda TTT
 7th Overall Tour de Yorkshire
 9th Overall Tour of California
2019
 1st  Young rider classification Giro Rosa
 1st  Young rider classification Tour of California
 3rd Open de Suède Vårgårda TTT
 3rd Overall Tour de Bretagne Féminin
1st  Young rider classification
 4th Time trial, National Road Championships
 7th La Classique Morbihan
2020
 1st  Time trial, National Road Championships
 1st  Time trial, National under–23 Road Championships
 6th Time trial, UEC European Road Championships
 8th Liège–Bastogne–Liège
2021
 2nd Overall The Women's Tour
 6th La Flèche Wallonne
 6th Brabantse Pijl
 8th Overall Tour of Norway
 10th Overall Festival Elsy Jacobs
2022
 1st  Overall Vuelta a Burgos
 1st Stage 6 Giro d'Italia
 4th Overall Tour de France
 5th Brabantse Pijl
 7th Road race, UCI Road World Championships
 9th Overall Tour de Romandie
 10th Overall Setmana Ciclista Valenciana

References

External links
 

1998 births
Living people
French female cyclists
Sportspeople from Doubs
Olympic cyclists of France
Cyclists at the 2020 Summer Olympics
Cyclists from Bourgogne-Franche-Comté
21st-century French women
20th-century French women